Serdamba Batsuk (born 17 October 1955) is a Mongolian Olympic boxer. He represented his country in the light-flyweight division at the 1976 Summer Olympics. He won his first match against Enrique Rodríguez. He lost his second match against György Gedó.

References

External links
 

1955 births
Living people
Mongolian male boxers
Olympic boxers of Mongolia
Boxers at the 1976 Summer Olympics
Light-flyweight boxers
20th-century Mongolian people